Royal Baking Company is a historic bakery complex located at Raleigh, North Carolina. The original section was built in 1941, with additions made about 1946–1947, and in the 1960s.  The office section is constructed of cinder block with a facing of blond bricks and features corner-wrapping, metal-framed, ribbon windows in the International style.  The building also has cylindrical lamps with Art Deco style metal wall mounts.  The building has been converted to a retail complex.

It was listed on the National Register of Historic Places in 1997.

References 

Bakeries of the United States
Industrial buildings and structures on the National Register of Historic Places in North Carolina
International style architecture in North Carolina
Art Deco architecture in North Carolina
Industrial buildings completed in 1941
Buildings and structures in Raleigh, North Carolina
National Register of Historic Places in Raleigh, North Carolina